Pietari Osmo Jääskeläinen (born 20 June 1947 in Hankasalmi) is a Finnish politician who was member of Finnish Parliament in 2009–2015, representing The Finns Party. He became a member of Finnish Parliament in 2009 when Timo Soini was elected to the European Parliament and was re-elected in 2011. In 2015 Finnish parliamentary election, he was not re-elected.

References

External links
Parliament of Finland:Pietari Jääskeläinen 

1947 births
Living people
People from Hankasalmi
Finns Party politicians
Blue Reform politicians
Members of the Parliament of Finland (2007–11)
Members of the Parliament of Finland (2011–15)